CFMM-FM is a radio station in Prince Albert, Saskatchewan. Owned by the Jim Pattison Group, it broadcasts a CHR/Top 40 format branded as Power 99. The station was previously owned by Rawlco Communications until its sale in 2014.

CFMM began broadcasting on January 31, 1982 and also has a rebroadcaster at 92.1 FM in Waskesiu Lake with the call sign CFMM-FM-1.

References

External links
 
 

Fmm
Fmm
Fmm
Radio stations established in 1982
1982 establishments in Saskatchewan